The following is a list of indoor arenas in Japan with capacity for at least 4,000 spectators, most of the arenas in this list are for multi use purposes such as individual sports, team sports as well as cultural and political events.

Currently in use

Under construction

See also 
List of football stadiums in Japan
List of indoor arenas by capacity

References 

 
Japan
Indoor arenas
Indoor arenas